HK Bardejov is an ice hockey team playing in the Slovak Slovak 2. Liga, and formed in 2016, after HC 46 Bardejov announced the dissolvation of their club. They play in the city of Bardejov, Slovakia.

Honours

Domestic

Slovak 2. Liga
  3rd place (1): 2018–19

References

External links
Official club website  

Bardejov
2016 establishments in Slovakia
Sport in Bardejov